General Thomas Dawson (January 25, 1784 – February 26, 1846) represented Greene County, Georgia in the state legislature.

He served as Captain in the War of 1812 and as Major under General Adams in the Creek War.

He was the first white child born in Greene County after it was formed.  His parents were George Dawson and Ruth Skidmore.  His eight children included William Curran Dawson.

References
A collection of family records, with biographical sketches and other memoranda of various families and individuals bearing the name Dawson, or allied to families of that name. Comp. by Charles C. Dawson, pp 371-372.  Albany, N.Y.:  J. Munsell, 1874.
A Gazetteer of the State of Georgia
usgennet.org

1784 births
1846 deaths
People from Greene County, Georgia
Members of the Georgia General Assembly
19th-century American politicians
American military personnel of the War of 1812